Confluence Stadium is a multi-purpose stadium in Lokoja, Kogi State with a 25,000 seating capacity. It is the home ground of Kogi United and Confluence Queens in the Nigeria National League and Nigeria Women Premier League respectively. It was used as a temporary venue for the home games of Niger Tornadoes during the 2016 Nigeria Professional Football League.

References

External links
World Stadiums profile

Multi-purpose stadiums in Nigeria
Football venues in Nigeria